"Old Flame" is a song written by Reed Nielsen, and recorded by American country music artist Juice Newton. It was released in April 1986 as the third single and title track from her 1985 album Old Flame. Originally recorded and released by Poco as "This Old Flame" in 1984 from their album Inamorata, their version failed to chart.  The song reached No. 5 on the Billboard Hot Country Singles & Tracks chart.

Charts

References

1986 singles
1984 songs
Poco songs
Juice Newton songs
RCA Records Nashville singles
Song recordings produced by Richard Landis
Songs written by Reed Nielsen